The State Counsellor of Kazakhstan, formerly the State Secretary of Kazakhstan is an appointed post under the direct supervision of the President of Kazakhstan.

The State Counsellor develops proposals for the President on domestic and foreign policy and coordinates activities on social and cultural issues.

List of State Secretaries

References

Presidential Administration of Kazakhstan